Paul-Laurent Assoun (born 1948) is a former student of the École normale supérieure de Saint-Cloud.

Career
Psychoanalyst and Professor at the université de Paris VII where he founded the department of clinical human science (until the end of 2007), he is a member of the UMR CNRS psychoanalysis and social practice. From 1987-1993, he taught social and political philosophy at the Radboud University Nijmegen. Paul-Laurent Assoun is also the director of the Philosophie d'aujourd'hui collection of Presses universitaires de France, Psychoanalysis and social practice at Anthropos/Economica and a member of the editing committee of the psychoanalytic review penser/rêver  (éditions de l'Olivier).

Works
 Freud, la philosophie et les philosophes, PUF, 1976 2e éd. Quadrige, 2005, 
 Freud et Nietzsche, PUF, 1978, rééd. Quadrige: 1998, 
 Hedendaagse Franse Filosofen, réd. Assoun et al., Van Gorcum, 1987, 
 Le freudisme, PUF-Que sais-je, 1990, 
 Freud et Wittgenstein, PUF-Quadrige, 1996, 
 Introduction à la métapsychologie freudienne, Ed.: PUF-Quadrige, 1993, 
 Lacan, PUF 2003
 Le Couple inconscient : amour freudien et passion post-courtoise, Anthropos/Economica 2004
 Le fétichisme, PUF-Que sais-je, 2002, 
 Freud, la philosophie et les philosophes, Quadrige 2005
 Leçons psychanalytiques sur les phobies, Anthropos/Economica 2005
 Psychanalyse, Ed.: PUF-Quadrige, 2007, 
 (postface) François Ansermet, Maria-Grazia Sorrentino, Malaise dans l'institution: Le soignant et son désir, Ed.: Economica; 2007,

French psychoanalysts
ENS Fontenay-Saint-Cloud-Lyon alumni
1948 births
Living people